is a Japanese television series that premiered on Fuji Television on November 7, 2015 and ended on December 26.

It is the first lesbian-themed Japanese television drama and was created by the staff of reality series Terrace House and was called a "spin-off".

Characters
Sayuri Hayama

 is the protagonist and she is in grade three of high school.

Yui Shida

 is the other protagonist who aims to be a professional photographer.

Nao Fukuzawa

 is a student in high school and childhood friend of Sayuri.

Mirai Kadowaki

 is Sayuri's high school classmate.

Aoi Kurata

 is Sayuri's other high school classmate.

Ryutaro Saeki

 is a professional photographer and his assistant is Yui.

Madoka Shida

 is Yui's mother.

Keigo Hayama

 is Sayuri's father.

Keigo Hayama is portrayed by Mummy-D.

Episodes

References

External links
 

Japanese drama television series
Japanese LGBT-related television shows
Fuji TV dramas
2015 Japanese television series debuts
2015 Japanese television series endings
Lesbian-related television shows
2010s LGBT-related drama television series